Margarita Gasparyan was the defending champion, but chose not to participate.

Stefanie Vögele won the title, defeating An-Sophie Mestach in the final, 6–1, 6–2.

Seeds

Main draw

Finals

Top half

Bottom half

References 
 Main draw

Engie Open Metropole 42 - Singles